Caralophia loxochila, the Slantlip eel, is a species of eel in the family Ophichthidae. It is the only member of its genus. It is found in the western Atlantic Ocean in shallow waters around the Florida Keys, Bahamas and Brazil.

References

Ophichthidae
Fish described in 1955